Bowyer's Common is a village in East Hampshire, England. It is located in the East Hampshire district and part of the civil parish of Binsted.  

Villages in Hampshire